Club Deportivo Remolino  is a Salvadoran professional football club based in Santa Elena, Usulutan,  El Salvador.
	
The club currently plays in the Tercera Division de Fútbol Salvadoreño.

Honours

Domestic honours
 Segunda División Salvadorean and predecessors 
 Champions (1) : TBD
 Tercera División Salvadorean and predecessors 
 Champions:(1) : TBD

References

External links
 http://www.ceroacero.es/equipa.php?id=67578&epoca_id=143
 https://www.elsalvador.com/deportes/futbol/385840/mapa-interactivo-del-futbol-salvadoreno-donde-estan-cada-uno-de-los-74-equipos-del-pais/

Football clubs in El Salvador